"Everything's Gonna Be Alright" is a song by German group Sweetbox. It was released in October 1997 as the second single from their debut album, Sweetbox (1998), the only album that had American singer Tina Harris as the group's frontwoman. The song is based on "Air" from Johann Sebastian Bach's Orchestral Suite No. 3, played on the track by the German Symphony Orchestra. "Everything's Gonna Be Alright" is the most successful song of Sweetbox worldwide; it reached the top five in Austria, France, Iceland, Ireland, Norway, Spain, Sweden, and the United Kingdom. Outside Europe, the song peaked at number 46 on the US Billboard Hot 100.

Critical reception
Larry Flick from Billboard wrote, "American-born rapper Tina Harris makes a poetic debut on a track that combines slick, time-sensitive beats ... It's a move that enriches and elevates the final product. Such musical warmth inspires a heartfelt performance from Harris, who oozes the charisma of a major star."

Track listings

Charts and certifications

Weekly charts

Year-end charts

Certifications

Release history

References

1997 singles
1997 songs
2005 singles
Arrangements of compositions by Johann Sebastian Bach
Bertelsmann Music Group singles
RCA Records singles
Songs written by Tina Harris
Sweetbox songs